Bhale Thammudu is a 1985 Indian Telugu-language action drama film, produced by Satyanarayana, Suryanarayana under Satya Chitra banner and directed by Paruchuri brothers. It stars Nandamuri Balakrishna, Urvashi  and music scored by Chakravarthy.

Plot
The film begins in a town that calls the shots by 3 bestial M.L.A. Veera Swamy, Municipal Chairman Leela Prasad & Cooperative Bank Chairman Bhaskar Rao. Inspector Rajendra a mettlesome cop newly recruits where his elder brother Ravindra to stand as his subordinate. Rajendra deifies Ravindra & his wife and dotes on their kid. He is darling Latha sister of DSP Srinivas. Besides, Rajendra is acquainted with a prostitute Neelaveni and tries to change their path. Later, he discerns that Neelaveni is the wife of a patriot journalist Vidyadhar who is slain by the trio and she is forcibly dragged into this profession. For the time being, Rajendra draws a hard line to the threesome. So, they conspire to eliminate him through a savage ruffian Dada. Anyhow he upholds and reforms considering that Rajendra has pulled his widowed daughter Saraswati off against danger. 

Meanwhile, Srinivas objects to the love affair of Rajendra & Latha owing to the echelon. Exploiting it, Leela Prasad plans to knit Latha with his son Bhanu Prasad. Now, the triad scheme is to rob the cooperative bank but Rajendra wipes it out with the aid of Saraswati. Hence, raged venomous kills Ravindra's kid when infuriated Rajendra irrupts upon them, as a result, he is suspended. Soon after, he hinders the black guards as a common man. At that point, he uncovers that Neelaveni has witnessed the crime and tries to attest to her. But unfortunately, she too is killed when the Ravindra couple adopts her orphan child. Here, annoyed Rajendra onslaughts on the knaves in which Bhanu Prasad is hit hardest. Then, Leela Prasad files a charge against Rajendra. However, he absconds when Dada conceals him. In tandem, Bhanu Prasad is spared by Saraswati as a nurse. Thus, as an amendment, he decides to nuptial her. Forthwith, Rajendra accumulates the pieces of evidence against the traitors by creating a rift between them. At last, he ceases the baddies. Finally, the movie ends on a happy note with the marriage of Rajendra & Latha.

Cast

Nandamuri Balakrishna as Inspector Rajendra
Urvashi as Latha
Gollapudi Maruti Rao as M.L.A. Veeraswamy
Nutan Prasad as Leela Prasad
Chandra Mohan as Ravindra
Siva Krishna as Vidyadhar
Ranganath as D.S.P. Srinivas
Prabhakar Reddy as Dada
Nagesh as Constable Siva Rao
Rallapalli as Panthulu
Chalapathi Rao as Raju
Sakshi Ranga Rao as Constable 
Kakarala as Bhaskar Rao
Raj Varma as Kumar
Ramji as Bhanu Prasad  
Ashwini as Saraswathi
Prabha as Ravindra's wife
Jyothi as Neelaveni
Srilakshmi as Panthulu's wife 
Anuradha  as item number
Jayamalini as item number

Soundtrack

Music composed by Chakravarthy. Lyrics were written by Veturi. Music released on AVM Audio Company.

References

External links
 
Bhale Thammudu at Gaana

1985 films
Films scored by K. Chakravarthy
1980s Telugu-language films